Edward Kennedy (April 1, 1856 in Carbondale, Pennsylvania, United States – May 20, 1905 in New York City), was a professional baseball player who played outfielder in the major leagues from 1883 to 1886. He played for the New York Metropolitans and Brooklyn Grays.

External links

1856 births
1905 deaths
Major League Baseball outfielders
Baseball players from Pennsylvania
19th-century baseball players
New York Metropolitans players
Brooklyn Grays players
Binghamton Crickets (1870s) players
Utica (minor league baseball) players
Utica Pent Ups players
Capital City of Albany players
Rochester Hop Bitters players
New Bedford (minor league baseball) players
Rochester (minor league baseball) players
New York Metropolitans (minor league) players
Scranton Indians players
Waterbury Brassmen players
Lowell Magicians players
Lowell Chippies players
Hartford (minor league baseball) players
Worcester Grays players
Lebanon (minor league baseball) players